The Blyth River is a river in the Northern Territory, Australia.

Course and features
The headwaters rise east of Shadforth Hills and flows in a northerly direction through mostly uninhabited country, past the small community of Gamardi before discharging into Boucaut Bay.

The estuary formed at the river mouth is tidal in nature and in near pristine condition.

History
The river was named by Francis Cadell in 1867 after the Premier of South Australia, Arthur Blyth.

David Lindsay charted the river in 1883 during his expedition of Arnhem Land.

Fauna
Many species of fish are found in the river including Sailfin Glassfish, Macleay's Glassfish, Barred Grunter, Fly-specked Hardyhead and Pennyfish, Goby, Flathead Goby, Giant Gudgeon, Empire Gudgeon, Threadfin Rainbowfish, Barramundi, Diamond Mullet, Rainbowfish, Western Rainbowfish, Black-banded Rainbowfish, Chequered Rainbowfish, Bony Bream, Black Catfish, Rendahl's Catfish, Seven-spot Archerfish.

See also

List of rivers of Northern Territory

References

Rivers of the Northern Territory
Arnhem Land
Arafura Sea